Victor Gollancz Ltd was a major British book publishing house of the twentieth century and continues to publish science fiction and fantasy titles as an imprint of Orion Publishing Group. 

Gollancz was founded in 1927 by Victor Gollancz, and specialised in the publication of high-quality literature, nonfiction, and popular fiction, including crime, detective, mystery, thriller, and science fiction. Upon Gollancz's death in 1967, ownership passed to his daughter, Livia, who in 1989 sold it to Houghton Mifflin. Three years later in October 1992, Houghton Mifflin sold Gollancz to the publishing house Cassell & Co. Cassell and its parent company Orion Publishing Group were acquired by Hachette in 1996, and in December 1998 the merged Orion/Cassell group turned Gollancz into its science fiction/fantasy imprint.

Origins as a political house

Gollancz was left-inclined in politics and a supporter of socialist movements. This is reflected in some of the call for the books he published. Victor Gollancz commissioned George Orwell to write about the urban working class in the North of England; the result was The Road to Wigan Pier. His break with Orwell came when he declined to publish Orwell's account of the Spanish Civil War, Homage to Catalonia, the pair having drifted apart on political grounds. He did publish The Red Army Moves by Geoffrey Cox on the Winter War, which was critical of the Soviet attack on Finland, but also foresaw that the Red Army would defeat the Germans. He also published works by German exiles, such as Hilde Meisel.

Gollancz was the original publisher of a number of authors and their books including:
George Orwell with Down and Out in Paris and London in 1933
Alfred Ayer with Language, Truth and Logic in 1936
A. J. Cronin with The Citadel in 1937
Daphne du Maurier with Rebecca in 1938
Kingsley Amis with Lucky Jim in 1953
Colin Wilson with The Outsider in 1956
John le Carré with Call for the Dead in 1961
E. P. Thompson with The Making of the English Working Class in 1963
Anthony Price with The Labyrinth Makers in 1971.

Many of Gollancz's books were published in one of their familiar house dust jackets, of which the most famous was bright yellow, with the title and author rendered in a vibrant, bold typography.

The Left Book Club, the first book club in the UK, was a publishing group pioneered by Gollancz that exerted a strong left-wing influence in Great Britain from 1936 to 1948. It offered a monthly book choice, for sale to members only, as well as a newsletter that acquired the status of a major political magazine. It also held an annual rally. Membership peaked at 57,000 but it eventually ceased publishing in 1948. The books and pamphlets were published with their distinctive covers — orange for paperback (1936–1938) and red for hardback (1938–1948) editions.

Transition to science fiction and fantasy genres
From the early 1960s through the late 1990s, Gollancz Science Fiction was the pre-eminent hardcover science fiction publishing list in the UK, for the first quarter century being both recognisable by, and famous for, its distinctive Gollancz Yellow dust-jackets with black and magenta typography, providing a major part of the publisher's output, alongside Gollancz' crime fiction and general fiction lists. Full-colour dust-jackets were introduced on the science fiction list from the mid-1980s adding significantly to production costs, but also to commercial sales - an important consideration with increasing pressure upon the UK's public library system's budgets.
In 1998, Gollancz was diminished into just the science fiction and fantasy imprint Gollancz Science Fiction after it was acquired by Orion Publishing Group. Gollancz has also proceeded to publish the SF Masterworks series, and the Fantasy Masterworks series previously appearing under the Orion sister-imprint Millennium. Gollancz has published award-winning and award-nominated books by, among others:

 Joe Abercrombie
 J. G. Ballard (later works)
 Stephen Baxter
 Greg Bear
 Jonathan Carroll
 Mark Chadbourn
 Arthur C. Clarke
 Michael Coney
 Robert Cormier
 Peter Delacorte
 Thomas Disch
 Stephen R. Donaldson
 Christopher Evans
 Jaine Fenn
 Maggie Furey
 Mary Gentle
 William Gibson
 Jon Grimwood
 Michael Harrison
 Joe Hill
 Robert Holdstock
 Stephen Hunt
 Gwyneth Jones
 Graham Joyce
 Roger Levy
 James Lovegrove
 Scott Lynch
 Paul McAuley
 Ian McDonald
 George R. R. Martin
 Richard Morgan
 Terry Pratchett
 Christopher Priest
 Robert V. S. Redick
 Alastair Reynolds
 Keith Roberts
 Adam Roberts
 Patrick Rothfuss
 Geoff Ryman
 Brandon Sanderson
 Robert J. Sawyer
 Robert Shaw
 Dan Simmons
 Alison Sinclair
 John Sladek
 Bruce Sterling
 Jack Vance
 Ian Watson
 Gene Wolfe

Expansion into manga
In 2005, Gollancz set up a manga publishing arm, Gollancz Manga, which published UK editions of various Viz Media properties. As of 2014, Gollancz no longer publish manga and Viz Media have re-released the publisher's series.

The following titles have been published:

SF Gateway website
In 2011, Gollancz launched the SF Gateway website, an online library that features out-of-print science fiction books republished as e-books. Gollancz aims to make 5,000 or more books available by 2014 and the website will be integrated with the online Encyclopedia of Science Fiction.

Accolades
In terms of the number of published works that have been nominated for major awards, Gollancz ranks as one of the field's top publishers of science fiction, fantasy and horror fiction.

Book series
Common Sense
Left Book Club
New People's Library

References

Further reading
 Edwards, Ruth Dudley. Victor Gollancz: A Biography. London: V. Gollancz, 1987. .
 Hodges, Sheila. Gollancz: The Story of a Publishing House, 1928–1978. London: V. Gollancz, 1978. .
 Williams, Richard and Ralph Spurrier. Gollancz Crime Fiction 1928-1988: A Checklist of the First Editions, with a Guide to their Values. Scunthorpe: Dragonby Press, 1989. .

External links
 SF Gateway
 Catalogue of the Victor Gollancz Ltd archives, held at the Modern Records Centre, University of Warwick

British speculative fiction publishers
Publishing companies established in 1927
George Orwell
Science fiction publishers
Victor Gollancz Ltd books
British companies established in 1927